Bounoura is a district in Ghardaïa Province, Algeria. It was named after its capital, Bounoura.

Municipalities
The district is further divided into 2 municipalities:
Bounoura
El Atteuf

References

Districts of Ghardaïa Province